In algebraic geometry,  flips  and  flops are  codimension-2 surgery operations arising in the minimal model program, given by blowing up along a relative canonical ring.  In dimension 3 flips are used to construct minimal models, and any two birationally equivalent  minimal models are connected by a sequence of flops. It is conjectured that the same is true in higher dimensions.

The minimal model program

The minimal model program can be summarised very briefly as follows: given a variety , we construct a sequence of contractions , each of which contracts some curves on which the canonical divisor  is negative. Eventually,  should become nef (at least in the case of nonnegative Kodaira dimension), which is the desired result. The major technical problem is that, at some stage, the variety  may become 'too singular', in the sense that the canonical divisor  is no longer a Cartier divisor, so the intersection number  with a curve  is not even defined.

The (conjectural) solution to this problem is the flip. So we can put , and continue the process.

Two major problems concerning flips are to show that they exist and to show that one cannot have an infinite sequence of flips. If both of these problems can be solved, then the minimal model program can be carried out. 
The existence of log flips, a more general kind of flip, in dimension three and four were proved by 
whose work was fundamental to the solution of the existence of log flips and other problems in higher dimension. 
On the other hand, the problem of termination—proving that there can be no infinite sequence of flips—is still open in dimensions greater than 3.

Definition
If  is a morphism, and K is the canonical bundle of X, then the relative canonical ring of f is

and is a sheaf of graded algebras over the sheaf  of regular functions on Y.
The blowup 

of Y along the relative canonical ring is a morphism to Y. If the relative canonical ring is finitely generated (as an algebra over  ) then the  morphism  is called the flip of  if   is relatively ample, and the flop of  if K is relatively trivial.

In applications,  is often  a small contraction of an extremal ray, which implies several extra properties:
The exceptional sets of both maps  and  have codimension at least 2,
 and  only have mild singularities, such as terminal singularities.

Examples

References

 

 
 

Algebraic geometry
Birational geometry